The second season of the crime and action drama Magnum P.I. premiered on September 27, 2019, on CBS, for the 2019–20 United States network television schedule. The series is a remake of the 1980 series of the same name and centers on Thomas Magnum, a former Navy SEAL who works as a private investigator and solves mysteries with his business partner Juliet Higgins and other friends. It stars Jay Hernandez, Perdita Weeks, Zachary Knighton, Stephen Hill, Amy Hill, and Tim Kang. The season was ordered on January 25, 2019 for a twenty episode season. Multiple Hawaii Five-0 stars appeared as their Hawaii Five-0 characters in a two-part crossover event as well as in guest roles throughout the season in minor crossover events.

The season was split into two parts, with the first part concluding on January 31, 2020, after airing fourteen episodes, to allow for MacGyver to enter the television schedule as a mid-season replacement. It then continued airing its remaining six episodes on April 10, 2020, holding the timeslot that was freed up by  airing its series finale. The season was viewed by an average of 8.91 million viewers and ranked 27 out of all television series for the season. "Payback For Beginners," the season premiere, brought in 6.40 million viewers while "A Leopard on the Prowl," the season finale was viewed by 6.49 million. "Desperate Measures," the seasons twelfth episode, which also served as the conclusion to the two-part fictional crossover with Hawaii Five-0, was the highest viewed episode of the season at 8.76 million. The season concluded on May 8, 2020, and was renewed for a third season that premiered on December 4, 2020.

Cast and characters

Main
 Jay Hernandez as Thomas Magnum, a former Navy SEAL who is a security consultant for the successful novelist Robin Masters, living in the guest house on his estate, while also working as a private investigator
 Perdita Weeks as Juliet Higgins, a former MI6 agent who is majordomo to Robin Masters; she and Magnum bicker but become allies
 Zachary Knighton as Orville "Rick" Wright, a friend of Magnum's who is a Marine veteran and former door gunner, who runs his own tiki bar and is also a playboy
 Stephen Hill as Theodore "T.C." Calvin, a friend of Magnum's who is a Marine veteran and helicopter pilot who runs helicopter tours of Hawaii
 Amy Hill as Teuila "Kumu" Tuileta, the cultural curator of Robin Masters' estate
 Tim Kang as Honolulu Police Department (HPD) Detective Gordon Katsumoto, who dislikes Magnum but usually comes to the team's aid when needed.

Recurring
 Christopher Thornton as Kenny "Shammy" Shamberg
 Bobby Lee as Jin Jeong

Notable guests

 Brooke Lyons as Abby Miller
 Deontay Wilder as Noah
 Aaron Donald as himself
 Corbin Bernsen as Icepick
 Hans Hedemann as himself
 Patrick Monahan as himself
 Skylar Grey as herself
 Jerry Becker as himself
 Luis Carlos Maldonado as himself
 Stephanie Lum as herself
 Domenick Lombardozzi as Sebastian Nuzo
 Louis Lombardi as Paulie Nuzo
 James Remar as Captain Buck Greene
 Peter Facinelli as Gene Curtis/Ivan
 Melissa Tang as Erin Hong
 Chef Roy Yamaguchi as himself
 Janel Parrish as Maleah
 Andre Reed as Eddie Butler and himself
 Betsy Phillips as Suzy Madison
 Cowboy Cerrone as Reese
 Sonya Balmores as Leanna Owens
 Bre Blair as Lina
 Barbara Eve Harris as Lucy Akina
 Catherine Dent as Georgia Preston

Crossover

 Larry Manetti as Nicky "The Kid" DeMarco
 Taylor Wily as Kamekona Tupuola 
 Kimee Balmilero as Dr. Noelani Cunha
 William Forsythe as Harry Brown
 Shawn Mokuahi Garnett as Flippa
 Willie Garson as Gerard Hirsch
 Meaghan Rath as Tani Rey
 Katrina Law as Quinn Liu
 Beulah Koale as Junior Reigns
 Dennis Chun as HPD Sergeant Duke Lukela
 Ian Anthony Dale as Adam Noshimuri

Episodes

The number in the "No. overall" column refers to the episode's number within the overall series, whereas the number in the "No. in season" column refers to the episode's number within this particular season. Numerous episodes are named after similarly named episodes from the original series. "Production code" refers to the order in which the episodes were produced while "U.S. viewers (millions)" refers to the number of viewers in the U.S. in millions who watched the episode as it was aired.

Crossovers

Prior to the first season's airing, executive producer, co-showrunner, and co-developer Peter M. Lenkov stated that he had plans for a major two-part crossover event between Magnum P.I and fellow reboot Hawaii Five-0 (for which he was also developer, executive producer, and showrunner). A full crossover event did not occur during the first season, although series regulars from Hawaii Five-0 appeared throughout the season. On September 9, 2019, TVLine reported via an interview with Lenkov that a story for the crossover had been developed and that he intended on making it happen sooner than later. It was later reported that the two-part crossover would air on January 3, 2020. The crossover event featured Magnum P.I. actors Hernandez, Weeks, Knighton, and Hill appearing in the Hawaii Five-0 episode while Hawaii Five-0 actors Meaghan Rath, Katrina Law, and Beulah Koale appeared in the Magnum P.I. episode. Knighton also appeared in a second episode later on in the tenth season of Hawaii Five-0. In addition, other Hawaii Five-0 actors made appearances throughout the entire season.

Production

Development
On January 25, 2019, Magnum P.I. was renewed for a second season along with other CBS freshman series FBI and The Neighborhood. Peter M. Lenkov returned to the series as executive producer and co-showrunner after signing a three-year deal with CBS Television Studios in 2018. Eric Guggenheim also returned as executive producer and co-showrunner. On the November 15, 2019 episode, "He Came by Night," the band Train with artist Skyler Grey made the first public performance of their new song "Mai Tais" on the series. It was later revealed that the season would consist of twenty-episodes. On May 8, 2020, Magnum P.I. was renewed for a third season which premiered on December 4, 2020, after being delayed due to the COVID-19 pandemic. On July 7, 2020, after the season concluded, it was announced that this would be the final season for Lenkov in his role after he was fired with a year left in his contract due to allegations over creating a toxic work environment.

Filming
Filming for the season began with a traditional Hawaiian blessing on July 8, 2019. A new filming location in the season is the La Mariana Restaurant, an operating Tiki Bar in Hawaii. "Desperate Measures," the second half of the crossover with Hawaii Five-0 filmed in mid-November 2019.

Casting
Christopher Thornton, who recurred in the first season, continued to recur throughout the season. Bobby Lee was introduced as a new character in the season and also recurred. Brooke Lyons returned for two episodes this season as Abby Miller, Magnum's love interest, after guest starring in an episode of the first season. Lyons was subsequently written out after being cast in another series. Corbin Bernsen who also guest starred in the first season and returned for two episodes. Numerous professional athletes appeared in guest roles throughout the season including Deontay Wilder, a World Boxing Council heavyweight champion, Aaron Donald and Andre Reed, National Football League players, Hans Hedemann, a competitive surfer, and Cowboy Cerrone, an Ultimate Fighting Championship mixed martial artist. Patrick Monahan, Skyler Grey, Jerry Becker, and Luis Carlos Maldonado appeared as themselves and performed as their real world band Train. Stephanie Lum, a Hawaii News Now anchor, also appeared as herself. Roy Yamaguchi, an American-Japanese chef guest starred as himself. Betsy Phillips, series star Zachary Knighton's wife, appeared in the seasons final episode. Hawaii Five-0 series regulars Kimee Balmilero and Taylor Wily recurred throughout the season as their Hawaii Five-0 characters medical examiner Dr. Noelani Cunha and entrepreneur Kamekona Tupuola. Meaghan Rath, Katrina Law, Beulah Koale, Dennis Chun, and Ian Anthony Dale also Hawaii Five-0 series regulars made guest appearances in the season as their Hawaii Five-0 characters. In addition, other Hawaii Five-0 guest stars including Larry Manetti, Willaim Forsythe, Shawn Mokuahi Garnett, Willie Garson all appeared as their characters as well. Both Chun and Manetti previously starred on the original Magnum, P.I..

Marketing and release
When CBS revealed its fall schedule for the 2019–2020 broadcast season it was revealed that Magnum P.I. would feature a timeslot change for the season moving from Monday's to Friday's at 9 PM ET. On August 14, 2019, it was announced that the first episode of the season would have an advanced premiere screening along with the premiere of the tenth season of Hawaii Five-0. The annual event known as "Sunset on the Beach" took place on September 18, 2019, and featured a performance form the band Train. It was later reported that the season would premiere on September 27, 2019. In January 2020 it was announced that the season would be split into two parts, with the first part concluding with episode fourteen on January 31, 2020, to allow MacGyver to enter the television schedule as a mid-season replacement. Following the timeslot being freed up by the Hawaii Five-0 series finale, the season continued airing its remaining six episodes on April 10, 2020. The final two episodes of the season aired back-to-back on May 8, 2020, with the series holding the 10 PM ET timeslot as well and concluding with a total of twenty episodes. In Canada, CTV aired the series in simulcast with CBS. Meanwhile, in the United Kingdom, the season began airing on Sky One on December 29, 2019 while the second part began airing on April 19, 2020.

Viewing figures

Home media

References

2019 American television seasons
2020 American television seasons
Split television seasons
Magnum, P.I.